John Gere Jayne (May 12, 1874 – September 6, 1920) was an attorney and American football and baseball coach for the Sewanee Tigers of Sewanee: The University of the South.

Early years
Jayne was the son of Samuel Carver Jayne and Hattie Gere. Samuel was the cashier at the First National Bank. Hattie's mother was the aunt of Grover Cleveland. He attended Princeton University, where he got his law degree. He was a pitcher and outfielder on the baseball team. He graduated in June 1897.

Sewanee
Jayne's first year coaching Sewanee football was the worst in its history. He then coached the 1898 Sewanee football team to the Southern Intercollegiate Athletic Association (SIAA) championship.

Head coaching record

References

External links
 

1874 births
1920 deaths
19th-century baseball players
Baseball outfielders
Baseball pitchers
Princeton Tigers baseball players
Sewanee Tigers football coaches
People from Berwick, Pennsylvania
19th-century American lawyers